Callithomia is a genus of clearwing (ithomiine) butterflies, named by Henry Walter Bates in 1862. They are in the brush-footed butterfly family, Nymphalidae.

Species
Arranged alphabetically:
Callithomia alexirrhoe Bates, 1862
Callithomia hezia (Hewitson, [1854])
Callithomia lenea (Cramer, [1779])

References

Ithomiini
Nymphalidae of South America
Nymphalidae genera
Taxa named by Henry Walter Bates